Žďár is a village and a part of the town Nalžovské Hory in the District of Klatovy, the Czech Republic, located about 5 km north of Nalžovské Hory. The village is located on the road II/186. There are 46 registered addresses in Žďár. In 2011, Žďár had a population of 68 inhabitants.

Žďár is located in the cadastral area of Žďár u Nalžovských Hor, which covers an area of 5.18 km2.

History 
The first written mention of the village dates back to 1383.

Gallery

References 

Villages in Klatovy District